The Carlisle Rock Island Depot is a historic railroad station at Main and Court Streets in Carlisle, Arkansas.  It is a -story masonry and frame structure, finished in brick with half-timbered stucco.  A passenger station, it was organized with a central service area for ticketing and telegrapher's bay, with waiting rooms on either side, one for whites, and one for African-Americans.  The station was built about 1920 by the Rock Island Railroad; it is a prominent local example of Tudor Revival style, and is historically significant for its role in the growth of the city of Carlisle.

The building was listed on the National Register of Historic Places in 1990.

See also
National Register of Historic Places listings in Lonoke County, Arkansas

References

Tudor Revival architecture in the United States
Buildings and structures in Lonoke County, Arkansas
National Register of Historic Places in Lonoke County, Arkansas